Princess Sao Sanda (also known as Sao Nang Mya Sanda, (စောနန်းမြစန္ဒာ) and Sanda Simms; born 20 October 1928) is the last princess of Yawnghwe, a now disestablished Shan state in present-day Myanmar. She is the eldest daughter of the last Saopha of Yawnghwe Sao Shwe Thaik by his consort Sao Nang Sanda. A journalist at Reuters, she coauthored several books with her husband Peter Simms. Her 2008 book The Moon Princess: Memories of the Shan States chronicles a turbulent period in Burma's history, providing both her life story and a chronicle of her father, the first president of the Union of Burma after its independence.

Life
Sao Sanda was born on 20 October 1928 into the royal family of Yawnghwe. She was the firstborn daughter of Sao Shwe Thaik and his mistress Sao Nang Sanda. She studied at the American Methodist School in Kalaw. In 1947, she accompanied her father to the Panglong Conference. Still in 1947, she alongside her father and stepmother Sao Nang Hearn Kham attended the wedding of Crown Princess Elizabeth. She continued her education in the UK, and earned her B.A. (Hons) in 1953 and M.A. (Hons) in 1956 from Girton College, Cambridge.

Sanda was married to Peter Simms, a journalist, in Bangkok. In 1956, after returning to Burma, she worked as a newsreader and commentator for the Burma Broadcasting Service for four years, while her husband Peter Simms worked at Rangoon University. The couple fled the country after the 1962 Burmese coup d'état. Her father was arrested by the Union Revolutionary Council headed by General Ne Win. Her brother, who was 17 at the time, was killed in the military coup, apparently the only casualty on the day of the disturbances. After moving to Laos, they worked as journalists in several countries, including Thailand, Singapore, Hong Kong, Canada and Oman. After relocating to France and the United Kingdom in 1987, they began writing books. After the death of her husband in 2002, she began writing her memoirs, The Moon Princess: Memories of the Shan States, which was published in 2008. Her book was translated into Burmese by historian Maung Than Swe under the title The Kanbawza Princess Sao Sanda (ကမ္ဘောဇ မင်းသမီးလေး စဝ်စန္ဒာ); this translated edition was first published in 2014.

, Sao Sanda and Saw Nwam Oo (a princess of Lawksawk State) were the only living attendees of the 1947 Panglong Conference. Sao Sanda's Panglong experience is described in The Moon Princess while Saw Nwam Oo described her own experience of the event in her own autobiography, My Lost World.

Works
The Moon Princess: Memories of the Shan States
Great Lords Of The Sky: Burma's Shan Aristocracy 
Laos, Then: Travels in the Kingdom (co-authored with Peter Simms)
The Kingdoms of Laos (co-authored with Peter Simms)
The  Wines of Corbières & Fitou (co-authored with Peter Simms)

References

1928 births
20th-century Burmese people
Burmese exiles
Burmese people of Shan descent
Alumni of Girton College, Cambridge
Burmese politicians
Burmese princesses
Burmese royalty
People from Shan State
Living people
Burmese journalists
Burmese women writers